Widmerpool may refer to:

 Widmerpool, a village and civil parish in Nottinghamshire, England
 Widmerpool Gulf, a geographical trough which existed as open water during the Lower Carboniferous (Tournaisian Age)
 Robert Widmerpool (d. 1588), an English martyr
 Kenneth Widmerpool, later Lord Widmerpool, the anti-hero of Anthony Powell's series of novels A Dance to the Music of Time